Method of glucose uptake differs throughout tissues depending on two factors; the metabolic needs of the tissue and availability of glucose. The two ways in which glucose uptake can take place are facilitated diffusion (a passive process) and secondary active transport (an active process which on the ion-gradient which is established through the hydrolysis of ATP, known as primary active transport). Active transport is the movement of ions or molecules going against the concentration gradient.


Facilitated diffusion 
There are over 10 different types of glucose transporters; however, the most significant for study are GLUT1-4.

GLUT1 and GLUT3 are located in the plasma membrane of cells throughout the body, as they are responsible for maintaining a basal rate of glucose uptake. Basal blood glucose level is approximately 5mM (5 millimolar). The Km value (an indicator of the affinity of the transporter protein for glucose molecules; a low Km value suggests a high affinity) of the GLUT1 and GLUT3 proteins is 1mM; therefore GLUT1 and GLUT3 have a high affinity for glucose and uptake from the bloodstream is constant.
 
GLUT2 in contrast has a high Km value (15-20mM) and therefore a low affinity for glucose. They are located in the plasma membranes of hepatocytes and pancreatic beta cells (in mice, but GLUT1 in human beta cells; see Reference 1). The high Km of GLUT2 allows for glucose sensing; rate of glucose entry is proportional to blood glucose levels.

GLUT4 transporters are insulin sensitive, and are found in muscle and adipose tissue. As muscle is a principal storage site for glucose and adipose tissue for triglyceride (into which glucose can be converted for storage), GLUT4 is important in post-prandial uptake of excess glucose from the bloodstream. Moreover, several recent papers show that GLUT 4 is present in the brain also. The drug metformin phosphorylates GLUT4, thereby increasing its sensitivity to insulin.

During fasting, some GLUT4 transporters will be expressed at the surface of the cell. However, most will be found in cytoplasmic vesicles within the cell. After a meal and at the binding of insulin (released from the islets of Langerhans) to receptors on the cell surface, a signalling cascade begins by activating phosphatidylinositolkinase activity which culminates in the movement of the cytoplasmic vesicles toward the cell surface membrane. Upon reaching the plasmalemma, the vesicles fuse with the membrane, increasing the number of GLUT4 transporters expressed at the cell surface, and hence increasing glucose uptake.

Secondary active transport 
Facilitated diffusion can occur between the bloodstream and cells as the concentration gradient between the extracellular and intracellular environments is such that no ATP hydrolysis is required.

However, in the kidney, glucose is reabsorbed from the filtrate in the tubule lumen, where it is at a relatively low  concentration, passes through the simple cuboidal epithelia lining the kidney tubule, and into the bloodstream where glucose is at a comparatively high concentration. Therefore, the concentration gradient of glucose opposes its reabsorption, and energy is required for its transport.
 
The secondary active transport of glucose in the kidney is Na+ linked; therefore an Na+ gradient must be established. This is achieved through the action of the Na+/K+ pump, the energy for which is provided through the hydrolysis of ATP. Three Na+ ions are extruded from the cell in exchange for two K+ ions entering through the intramembrane enzyme Na+/K+-ATPase; this leaves a relative deficiency of Na+ in the intracellular compartment. Na+ ions diffuse down their concentration gradient into the columnar epithelia, co-transporting glucose. Once inside the epithelial cells, glucose reenters the bloodstream through facilitated diffusion through GLUT2 transporters.
 
Hence reabsorption of glucose is dependent upon the existing sodium gradient which is generated through the active functioning of the NaKATPase. As the cotransport of glucose with sodium from the lumen does not directly require ATP hydrolysis but depends upon the action of the ATPase, this is described as secondary active transport.

There are two types of secondary active transporter found within the kidney tubule; close to the glomerulus, where glucose levels are high, SGLT2 has a low affinity yet high capacity for glucose transport. Close to the loop of Henle and in the distal convoluted tubule of the nephron where much glucose has been reabsorbed into the bloodstream, SGLT1 transporters are found. These have a high affinity for glucose and a low capacity. Functioning in conjunction, these two secondary active transporters ensure that only negligible amounts of glucose are wasted through excretion in the urine.

References

1. De Vos, A., H. Heimberg, et al. (1995). "Human and rat beta cells differ in glucose transporter but not in glucokinase gene expression." The Journal of Clinical Investigation 96(5): 2489–2495.

Endocrinology